Philip Nicholas Johnson-Laird, FRS, FBA (born 12 October 1936) is a philosopher of language and reasoning and a developer of the mental model theory of reasoning. He was a professor at Princeton University's Department of Psychology, as well as the author of several notable books on human cognition and the psychology of reasoning.

Biography
He was educated at Culford School and University College London where he won the Rosa Morison Medal in 1964 and a James Sully Scholarship between 1964–66. He achieved a BA there in 1964 and a PhD in 1967. He was elected to a Fellowship in 1994.

His entry in Who's Who (2007 edition) records the following career history:

Ten years of miscellaneous jobs, as surveyor, musician, hospital porter (alternative to National Service), librarian, before going to university.
Assistant Lecturer, then Lecturer, in Psychology, UCL, 1966–73
Visiting Member, Institute for Advanced Study in Princeton, New Jersey, 1971–72
Reader, 1973, Professor, 1978, in Experimental Psychology, University of Sussex
Visiting Fellow, Stanford University, 1980
Assistant Director, MRC Applied Psychology Unit, University of Cambridge, 1983–89
Fellow, Darwin College, Cambridge, 1984–89
Visiting Professorships: Stanford University, 1985; Princeton Univ., 1986.

He joined the department of psychology at Princeton University in 1989, where he became the Stuart Professor of Psychology in 1994. He retired in 2012.

Johnson-Laird is a member of the American Philosophical Society, a Fellow of the Royal Society, a Fellow of the British Academy, a William James Fellow of the Association for Psychological Science, and a Fellow of the Cognitive Science Society. He has been awarded honorary doctorates from: Göteborg, 1983; Padua, 1997; Madrid, 2000; Dublin, 2000; Ghent, 2002; Palermo, 2005. He won the Spearman Medal in 1974, the British Psychological Society President's Award in 1985, and the International Prize from Fyssen Foundation in 2002.

Along with several other scholars, Johnson-Laird delivered the 2001 Gifford Lectures in Natural Theology at the University of Glasgow, published as The Nature and Limits of Human Understanding (ed. Anthony Sanford, T & T Clark, 2003). He has been a member of the United States National Academy of Sciences since 2007.

Selected publications

References

1936 births
Living people
People educated at Culford School
Alumni of University College London
Princeton University faculty
British consciousness researchers and theorists
American cognitive psychologists
20th-century British psychologists
Fellows of Darwin College, Cambridge
Academics of University College London
Fellows of the Royal Society
British expatriate academics in the United States
Members of the United States National Academy of Sciences
Members of the American Philosophical Society
Fellows of the British Academy
Fellows of the Cognitive Science Society